Bae Ki-Jong (or  ; born 26 May 1983) is a South Korean footballer, who plays as forward for Gyeongnam FC. He has also represented South Korea internationally.

Career

Club career
Bae's first club was Daejeon Citizen. With them he was nominated Rookie of the Year award. At the end of 2006, he transferred to Suwon Samsung Bluewings.

On 17 December 2009, he moved to Jeju United. In his first season with the Jeju, Bae scored five league goals and one assists. In his second season with the Jeju, Bae scored his first goal of the new season in a 2–1 win over Busan I'Park on 6 March 2011.

International career
On 28 March 2009, he made his first international match appearance against Iraq.

Club career statistics

References

External links
 
 National Team Player Record 
 
 
 

1983 births
Living people
Association football forwards
South Korean footballers
South Korea international footballers
Daejeon Hana Citizen FC players
Suwon Samsung Bluewings players
Jeju United FC players
Gyeongnam FC players
Ansan Mugunghwa FC players
K League 1 players
K League 2 players
People from Iksan
Sportspeople from North Jeolla Province